Hednota panteucha is a moth in the family Crambidae. It was described by Edward Meyrick in 1885. It is found in Australia, where it has been recorded from South Australia and Victoria.

References

Crambinae
Moths described in 1885